Hydrangea lingii is a species of flowering plant in the family Hydrangeaceae, native to China.

References

External links
 Hydrangea lingii at www.efloras.org.

lingii
Flora of China